Robert Penn (October 10, 1872 – June 8, 1912) was a United States Navy sailor and a recipient of America's highest military decoration—the Medal of Honor—for his actions during the Spanish–American War.

Biography
For his actions during the incident, Penn was issued the Medal of Honor five months later, on December 14, 1898.

He died in Las Animas, Colorado and is interred at Eden Cemetery in Collingdale, Pennsylvania.

Medal of Honor citation
Fireman Penn's official Medal of Honor citation reads:
On board the U.S.S. Iowa off Santiago de Cuba, 20 July 1898. Performing his duty at the risk of serious scalding at the time of the blowing out of the manhole gasket on board the vessel, Penn hauled the fire while standing on a board thrown across a coal bucket 1 foot above the boiling water which was still blowing from the boiler.

See also
 List of Medal of Honor recipients
 List of African American Medal of Honor recipients
 List of Medal of Honor recipients for the Spanish–American War

Notes

References

External links
 

1872 births
1912 deaths
American military personnel of the Spanish–American War
Burials at Eden Cemetery (Collingdale, Pennsylvania)
United States Navy Medal of Honor recipients
United States Navy sailors
People from the Greater Richmond Region
Spanish–American War recipients of the Medal of Honor